Atom Seed was an English hard rock band, popular in the early 1990s. They released their debut album, Get in Line in 1990.

History
Atom Seed were formed in early 1989 in London, England, by former Zoodoll guitarist Simon James' and bassist Chris Huxter's meeting with singer Paul Cunningham and the Iranian-born drummer, Amir. After recording a demo and playing a handful of gigs, Chris Huxter left in late 1989 to be replaced by Chris Dale on bass. The band toured the UK constantly as headliners and also supporting Wolfsbane and Red Hot Chili Peppers. Their debut EP was released in early 1990, followed in 1991 by the album Get in Line on FM Revolver Records. Amir was replaced by Jerry Hawkins (formerly of Metal Monkey Machine) on drums before the band's debut European tour. They were signed to London Records for the Dead Happy EP in 1992, but were dropped from the label and split up soon after, with an unreleased album, Hard Sell Paranoia, shelved.

After parting ways, their member's enjoyed success over the years, most notably Chris Dale performing, recording and writing for Bruce Dickinson. Dale now plays for the British heavy metal band Tank as well as his own pop rock band, Sack Trick. Simon James formed the band Moko Jumbi, recording an album for A&M Records in 1996 which remained unreleased after the label folded. In 2006, he released an acoustic album The Old Straight Track for Stovepony Records under the name 'Onions', launched at the Green Man Festival.

Discography

LPs
 Get in Line (1990) FM Revolver Records / (1991) London Records Worldwide
Tracks: "What You Say", "Get in Line", "Rebel", "Shake That Thing", "Shot Down", "Forget it Joe", "Better Day", "What?!", "Castles In The Sky", "Bitchin'", "What You Say" (Live), "Burn" (Live)

 Hard Sell Paranoia (1992) Unreleased
Tracks: "Enemy Song", "Love Money Hate", "Best of Life", "Mother Junk", "Tastes Like Money", "Idiots", "Delusions", "Changing Years", "Shadows", "Rooms", "Hard Sell Paranoia"

EPs
 I Don't Want To Talk About It (1990) ORG/FM Revolver Records
Tracks: "Doghouse", "Sexbeat", "Shake That Thing", "What?!"

 Rebel (1991) London Records
Tracks: "Rebel", "Everybody", "Forget It Joe", "Fools To Fall"

 Get In Line (1991) London Records
Tracks: "Get In Line", "Castles In The Sky", "What You Say" (Live), "Burn" (Live)

 Split with Sepultura – Rock Power Magazine (1991) : Tracks: Sepultura - "Dead Embryonic Cells"; Atom Seed - "Get in Line"

 Dead Happy  (1992) London Records
Tracks: "Happy", "What Gives?", "Fear", "The Assassin"

References

External links
 Atom Seed on Myspace

English hard rock musical groups
Musical groups established in 1989